Once I Loved a Girl in Vienna is a 1931 German comedy film directed by Erich Schönfelder and starring Werner Fuetterer, Gretl Theimer and Ernö Verebes.

Cast
Werner Fuetterer as Franz von Wergenthin
Gretl Theimer as Annerl
Ernö Verebes as Imre von Kövesháza
Hans Junkermann as treasurer von Wergenthin
Trude Hesterberg as Marchesa Giuseppina Savigliani
Ludwig Stössel as Valentin Rainer
Hermann Blaß as jeweller
Eugen Rex as Wenzel
Max Ehrlich as film director
Rudolf Lettinger
Fritz Spira
Erwin van Roy
Carl Geppert
Senta Liberty

References

External links

Films of the Weimar Republic
Films directed by Erich Schönfelder
German black-and-white films
German comedy films
1931 comedy films
1930s German films